The Minister of Finance of Germany is the head of the Federal Ministry of Finance and a member of the Federal Cabinet.

State Secretaries for Finance of the German Empire (1880–1918) 
 Adolf Heinrich Wilhelm Scholz 1880–1882
 Franz Emil Emanuel von Burchard 1882–1886
 Karl Rudolf Jacobi 1886–1888
 Baron Helmuth von Maltzahn 1888–1893
 Count Arthur von Posadowsky-Wehner 1893–1897
 Baron Max Franz Guido von Thielmann 1897–1903
 Baron Hermann von Stengel 1903–1908
 Reinhold Sydow 1908–1909
 Adolf Wermuth 1909–1912
 Hermann Kühn 1912–1915
 Karl Helfferich 1915–1916
 Count Siegfried von Roedern 1916–1918

Ministers of Finance (1918–1945)

Minister of Finance of the German Democratic Republic (1949–1990)

Ministers of Finance of the Federal Republic of Germany (1949–present) 
Political party:

See also 
 List of deputy finance ministers of Germany

Finance

nds:Bunnsministerium för'd Finanzen
pl:Ministrowie finansów Niemiec